Golpayegan and Khvansar (electoral district) is an electoral district in the Isfahan Province. This electoral district elects 1 member of parliament.

References

Electoral districts of Iran
Isfahan Province